Miguel Morayta (15 August 1907 – 19 June 2013) was a Spanish film director and screenwriter. He directed 74 films between 1944 and 1978. At the outbreak of the Spanish Civil War, Morayta was a Spanish artillery officer, who joined the Republican side. After Francisco Franco's victory, he left Spain for France and Africa, finally arriving in Mexico in 1941, where he started his career. He was living in Mexico when he died aged 105.

Selected filmography
 Amor perdido (1951)
 Road of Hell (1951)
 The Martyr of Calvary (1952)
 Pain (1953)
 Amor se dice cantando (1959)
 The Bloody Vampire (1962)
 La invasión de los vampiros (1963)
 Doctor Satán (1966)
 The Partisan of Villa (1967)
 La Bataille de San Sebastian (1968)

References

External links

1907 births
2013 deaths
People from the Province of Ciudad Real
Spanish film directors
Film directors from Castilla–La Mancha
Spanish screenwriters
Spanish male writers
Male screenwriters
Spanish army officers
Spanish military personnel of the Spanish Civil War (Republican faction)
Exiles of the Spanish Civil War in France
Spanish centenarians
Exiles of the Spanish Civil War in Mexico
Men centenarians